The 1998 GM Goodwrench Service Plus 400 was the second stock car race of the 1998 NASCAR Winston Cup Series and the 33rd iteration of the event. The race was held on Sunday, February 22, 1998, in Rockingham, North Carolina, at North Carolina Speedway, a  permanent high-banked racetrack. The race took the scheduled 393 laps to complete. Hendrick Motorsports driver Jeff Gordon would manage to claw his way after an initial bad start to the race within the closing laps to take his 30th career NASCAR Winston Cup Series victory and his first of the season. To fill out the podium, Penske-Kranefuss Racing driver Rusty Wallace and Roush Racing driver Mark Martin would finish second and third, respectively.

Background 

North Carolina Speedway was opened as a flat, one-mile oval on October 31, 1965. In 1969, the track was extensively reconfigured to a high-banked, D-shaped oval just over one mile in length. In 1997, North Carolina Motor Speedway merged with Penske Motorsports, and was renamed North Carolina Speedway. Shortly thereafter, the infield was reconfigured, and competition on the infield road course, mostly by the SCCA, was discontinued. Currently, the track is home to the Fast Track High Performance Driving School.

Entry list 

 (R) denotes rookie driver.

Practice

First practice 
The first practice session was held on Friday, February 20.

Final practice 
The final practice session, sometimes referred to as Happy Hour, was held on Saturday, February 21.

Qualifying 
Qualifying was split into two rounds. The first round was held on Friday, February 20, at 2:30 PM EST. Each driver would have one lap to set a time. During the first round, the top 25 drivers in the round would be guaranteed a starting spot in the race. If a driver was not able to guarantee a spot in the first round, they had the option to scrub their time from the first round and try and run a faster lap time in a second round qualifying run, held on Saturday, February 21. As with the first round, each driver would have one lap to set a time. On January 24, 1998, NASCAR would announce that the amount of provisionals given would be increased from last season. Positions 26-36 would be decided on time, while positions 37-43 would be based on provisionals. Six spots are awarded by the use of provisionals based on owner's points. The seventh is awarded to a past champion who has not otherwise qualified for the race. If no past champion needs the provisional, the next team in the owner points will be awarded a provisional.

Six drivers would fail to qualify: Kevin Lepage, Todd Bodine, Wally Dallenbach Jr., Morgan Shepherd, Dave Marcis, and Gary Bradberry.

Full qualifying results

Race results

References 

1998 NASCAR Winston Cup Series
NASCAR races at Rockingham Speedway
February 1998 sports events in the United States
1998 in sports in North Carolina